Phaeochoraceae is a family of sac fungi in the order Phyllachorales.

Genera
(with amount of species per genera)
Cocoicola  (5)
Phaeochora  (4)
Phaeochoropsis  (4)
Serenomyces  (4)

References

External links

Phyllachorales
Taxa named by Margaret Elizabeth Barr-Bigelow
Taxa described in 1997